Gauliga Danzig can refer to:
 A regional division of the Gauliga Ostpreußen (from 1933 to 1940)
 The Gauliga Danzig-Westpreußen (from 1940 to 1945)